Mazurov is a Slavic masculine surname whose feminine counterpart is Mazurova. Notable people with the surname include:

Kirill Mazurov (1914–1989), Belarusian politician
Victor Mazurov (born 1943), Russian mathematician

Russian-language surnames